Surender Nada is an Indian professional Kabaddi player. He was part of the 2016 Kabaddi World Cup winning team. Currently, he plays as a defender for the Bengal warriors franchise of Pro Kabaddi League.

Pro Kabaddi League

Surender started playing Kabaddi in the left corner for the franchise U Mumba in Season 1 of the Pro Kabaddi League.

He represented the Indian National Team in the 2016 Kabaddi World Cup held in Ahmedabad. He, along with his partner, right corner Mohit Chhillar, have since remained the first choice players for the national team in their respective positions. The two have gained a reputation as the most lethal left-right corner combo in the sport of Kabaddi which are the most important positions in the defensive set-up and strategy.

In Season 5 of Pro Kabaddi League, he was selected by the new franchise, Haryana Steelers, and offered him the captaincy.

He is consistently ranked among the Top Ten Defenders in all seasons of Pro Kabaddi league. In Season 1, he scored 51 tackle points in 15 games. In Season 5, he top scored with 80 tackle points in 22 matches.

In 2019, Nada was bought by Patna Pirates for 77 lakhs. In 2021, he was back in Haryana Steelers.

References 

Living people
Indian kabaddi players
Pro Kabaddi League players
People from Jhajjar district
Kabaddi players from Haryana
Year of birth missing (living people)
South Asian Games medalists in kabaddi
South Asian Games gold medalists for India